Barycz Valley Landscape Park (Park Krajobrazowy Dolina Baryczy) is a protected area (Landscape Park) in south-western Poland.

The Park is shared between two voivodeships: Lower Silesian Voivodeship and Greater Poland Voivodeship. Within Lower Silesian Voivodeship it lies in Milicz County (Gmina Milicz, Gmina Cieszków, Gmina Krośnice), Oleśnica County (Gmina Twardogóra) and Trzebnica County (Gmina Trzebnica, Gmina Prusice, Gmina Żmigród). Within Greater Poland Voivodeship it lies in Ostrów Wielkopolski County (Gmina Odolanów, Gmina Przygodzice, Gmina Sośnie).

The Park includes the Milicz Ponds (Stawy Milickie) nature reserve, which is a protected Ramsar wetland site.

References 

Barycz Valley
Parks in Greater Poland Voivodeship
Parks in Lower Silesian Voivodeship
Natura 2000 in Poland
Protected areas established in 1996